The Wilcox Formation is a geologic formation in Tennessee. It preserves fossils dating back to the Paleogene period.

The first hydrocarbon discover in the formation occurred in 1928, onshore Texas.  Subsequent field discoveries included the Seven Sisters Field, the Fandando Field , and in 1940 the Sheridan Field in Colorado County, Texas.  Notable offshore discoveries within the formation include BAHA No. 2, and in 2004, the giant Jack Field.

See also

 List of fossiliferous stratigraphic units in Tennessee
 Paleontology in Tennessee
 Jack 2
 Wilcox Group

References

 

Paleogene Louisiana
Paleogene geology of Tennessee